Maharaja Bir Bikram College or MBB College is a degree college of the Indian state of Tripura, imparting general education in the streams of Science, Commerce and Humanities. The motto of the college is "Vidayamrtamasnute" (Knowledge is the key to immortality). The college is named after former Maharaja of Tripura State, Bir Bikram Manikya Bahadur.

History 
Maharaja Bir Bikram Manikya Bahadur, the last king of Tripura, was the architect and founder of this college which was affiliated to University of Calcutta. The king had planned to establish a college at Agartala as early as 1937. An area of 254 acres of land (mostly Khas land and small acquired position) was earmarked for the college in the eastern part of the-then small capital town of Agartala. It was given the name "Vidyapattan".  Construction began in 1937 for which a trustee board was formed. The construction had to be abandoned when World War II broke out and the ground floor was converted into an army hospital for British Army moving to and from Burma. Maharaja Bir Bikram College (MBB College) started functioning in 1947 to meet the needs of college students who had migrated to Tripura from erstwhile East Pakistan. The-then Regent, Kanchan Prava Devi, responded to the needs of these uprooted Bengali students and almost overnight obtained the affiliation of Calcutta University for IA, ISC, B.A. and B. Com. examination.

Campus
The college campus has an area of over 254 acres. This includes the college faculties and the central library.

Departments
The institute has the following departments:
Arts group
Bengali
Economics
Education
English
Geography
Hindi
History
Kokborok
Philosophy
Physical Education
Political Science
Psychology
Sanskrit
Sociology
 Biological Science group

Botany
Environmental Science
Human Physiology
Zoology
 Physical Science group
Chemistry
IT & Computer Science
Mathematics
Physics
Statistics
 Commerce group
 Commerce

References

External links
 

Universities and colleges in Tripura
Colleges affiliated to Tripura University
Education in Agartala
Educational institutions established in 1947
1947 establishments in India
MBB College alumni
Colleges in Tripura